Jannero Pargo (born October 22, 1979) is an American professional basketball coach and former player who serves as an assistant coach for the Indiana Pacers of the National Basketball Association (NBA). He played college basketball for Neosho County CC and Arkansas.

College career
Graduating from Chicago's Paul Robeson High School in 1998, Pargo played collegiately for the University of Arkansas after transferring from Neosho County Community College in Chanute, Kansas in 2000.
Jennero was known at Arkansas for casually dribbling across the half court line and burying a deep 3-pointer. He produced several 30 point games during his tenure and was ahead of his time by firing up 3-pointers from anywhere on the floor, and hitting them, which has become commonplace in the NBA.

Professional career

Early years
From 2002 to 2008, Pargo played in the NBA for the Los Angeles Lakers, Toronto Raptors, Chicago Bulls and New Orleans Hornets. During the 2008 playoffs with the Hornets, he garnered attention by coming off the bench for star Chris Paul.  He averaged 10.3 points in 12 playoff games and hit big three-point shots in game 7 of the Western Conference Semifinals against the Spurs.

Europe
After the 2007–08 NBA season, Pargo signed a one-year, $3.8 million contract with the Russian League team Dynamo Moscow. In January 2009, Pargo secured a buyout from his Russian club and signed with the Greek League club Olympiacos. He was released by Olympiacos on May 5, 2009. He averaged 3.5 points and 1.4 assists per game in the Euroleague.

Return to the NBA
On July 13, 2009, Pargo signed a one-year deal with the Chicago Bulls, bringing him back to the Bulls and the NBA for a second time.

On September 24, 2010, he signed with the New Orleans Hornets. However, he was released before the start of the regular season because of his slow recovery from knee surgery.

On March 20, 2011, Pargo re-signed with the Bulls.

On December 16, 2011, Pargo was waived by the Bulls. On December 20, 2011, Pargo signed with the Atlanta Hawks.

On October 1, 2012, Pargo signed with the Washington Wizards. On November 15, 2012, Pargo was released by the Wizards to make room for Shaun Livingston.

On January 21, 2013, Pargo signed a 10-day contract with the Atlanta Hawks after injuries to Lou Williams and Devin Harris decimated their depth at the point guard position. On February 2, 2013, he signed a second 10-day contract with the Hawks.

On March 14, 2013, Pargo signed a 10-day contract with the Charlotte Bobcats. On March 24, 2013, he signed a second 10-day contract with the Bobcats, and on April 3, 2013, he signed for the remainder of the season. On August 9, 2013, he re-signed with the Bobcats. In April 2014, the Charlotte Bobcats were renamed the Hornets.

On July 25, 2014, Pargo re-signed with the Charlotte Hornets to a reported fully guaranteed one-year, $1.45 million contract. In his 2014–15 season debut on November 9, 2014, he became the first modern-day player to play for both the New Orleans Hornets and Charlotte Hornets franchises. On February 4, 2015, he was waived by the Hornets.

NBA Development League
On February 2, 2016, Pargo was acquired by the Oklahoma City Blue, and after rehabbing a left ankle sprain, he joined the team on March 31. That night, he made his debut for the Blue in a 122–117 loss to the Rio Grande Valley Vipers, recording 13 points, one rebound and two assists in 16 minutes off the bench. On February 23, 2017, Pargo was waived by the Blue.

The Basketball Tournament (TBT) (2017–present) 
In the summer of 2017, Pargo played in The Basketball Tournament on ESPN for team A Few Good Men (Gonzaga Alumni). He competed for the $2 million prize, and for team A Few Good Men, he scored 21 points in his only game played. Pargo helped take team A Few Good Men to the Super 16 round, where they then lost to Team Challenge ALS 77–60.

Coaching career
On September 15, 2017, Pargo was named as an assistant coach for the Windy City Bulls of the NBA G League., On July 1, 2019, Pargo was named an assistant coach for the Portland Trail Blazers. On August 9, 2021, Pargo was named an assistant coach for the Indiana Pacers.

NBA career statistics

Regular season

|-
| style="text-align:left;"|
| style="text-align:left;"|L.A. Lakers
| 34 || 0 || 10.1 || .398 || .292 || 1.000 || 1.1 || 1.1 || .4 || .1 || 2.5
|-
| style="text-align:left;"|
| style="text-align:left;"|L.A. Lakers
| 13 || 0 || 4.8 || .375 || .500 ||  || .5 || .8 || .2 || .0 || 1.1
|-
| style="text-align:left;"|
| style="text-align:left;"|Toronto
| 5 || 0 || 14.2 || .310 || .000 ||  || .8 || 2.4 || .8 || .2 || 3.6
|-
| style="text-align:left;"|
| style="text-align:left;"|Chicago
| 13 || 1 || 26.5 || .429 || .377 || .852 || 2.1 || 3.6 || .5 || .4 || 13.5
|-
| style="text-align:left;"|
| style="text-align:left;"|Chicago
| 32 || 0 || 14.2 || .385 || .348 || .739 || 1.5 || 2.4 || .5 || .0 || 6.4
|-
| style="text-align:left;"|
| style="text-align:left;"|Chicago
| 57 || 0 || 11.3 || .373 || .379 || .810 || 1.1 || 1.6 || .4 || .0 || 4.8
|-
| style="text-align:left;"|
| style="text-align:left;"|New Orleans/Oklahoma City
| 82 || 7 || 20.9 || .409 || .388 || .852 || 2.2 || 2.5 || .6 || .0 || 9.2
|-
| style="text-align:left;"|
| style="text-align:left;"|New Orleans
| 80 || 5 || 18.7 || .390 || .349 || .877 || 1.6 || 2.4 || .6 || .1 || 8.1
|-
| style="text-align:left;"|
| style="text-align:left;"|Chicago
| 63 || 5 || 13.2 || .346 || .275 || .933 || 1.2 || 1.4 || .5 || .0 || 5.5
|-
| style="text-align:left;"|
| style="text-align:left;"|Atlanta
| 50 || 0 || 13.4 || .415 || .384 || .950 || 1.5 || 1.9 || .4 || .0 || 5.6
|-
| style="text-align:left;"|
| style="text-align:left;"|Washington
| 7 || 0 || 14.6 || .250 || .150 || 1.000 || .9 || 2.0 || .0 || .1 || 3.0
|-
| style="text-align:left;"|
| style="text-align:left;"|Atlanta
| 7 || 0 || 16.1 || .342 || .350 || 1.000 || 1.0 || 2.7 || .4 || .0 || 5.0
|-
| style="text-align:left;"|
| style="text-align:left;"|Charlotte
| 18 || 0 || 16.2 || .401 || .382 || .889 || 1.2 || 1.9 || .8 || .1 || 8.4
|-
| style="text-align:left;"|
| style="text-align:left;"|Charlotte
| 29 || 0 || 8.3 || .441 || .400 || .727 || .7 || 1.8 || .5 || .0 || 4.7
|-
| style="text-align:left;"|
| style="text-align:left;"|Charlotte
| 9 || 0 || 8.1 || .429 || .409 || 1.000 || .3 || .9 || .0 || .0 || 4.6
|- class="sortbottom"
| style="text-align:center;" colspan="2"|Career
| 499 || 18 || 14.9 || .391 || .356 || .864 || 1.4 || 2.0 || .5 || .1 || 6.4

Playoffs

|-
| style="text-align:left;"|2003
| style="text-align:left;"|L.A. Lakers
| 11 || 0 || 11.7 || .333 || .267 || .750 || .8 || 1.3 || .7 || .1 || 2.1
|-
| style="text-align:left;"|2005
| style="text-align:left;"|Chicago
| 5 || 0 || 15.2 || .353 || .406 || .600 || 1.0 || 2.0 || .6 || .0 || 10.4
|-
| style="text-align:left;"|2006
| style="text-align:left;"|Chicago
| 5 || 0 || 3.8 || .417 || .600 || .800 || 1.2 || .6 || .0 || .0 || 3.4
|-
| style="text-align:left;"|2008
| style="text-align:left;"|New Orleans
| 12 || 0 || 22.1 || .388 || .349 || .708 || 2.5 || 2.3 || 1.0 || .2 || 10.2
|-
| style="text-align:left;"|2010
| style="text-align:left;"|Chicago
| 2 || 0 || 4.0 || .200 || .500 ||  || .0 || .5 || .0 || .0 || 1.5
|-
| style="text-align:left;"|2012
| style="text-align:left;"|Atlanta
| 5 || 0 || 9.2 || .286 || .333 ||  || 1.0 || 1.2 || .4 || .0 || 3.2
|-
| style="text-align:left;"|2014
| style="text-align:left;"|Charlotte
| 1 || 0 || 3.0 ||  ||  ||  || 1.0 || 1.0 || .0 || .0 || 0.0
|- class="sortbottom"
| style="text-align:center;" colspan="2"|Career
| 41 || 0 || 13.3 || .362 || .367 || .711 || 1.4 || 1.5 || .6 || .1 || 5.7

Personal life
Pargo's brother, Jeremy, is also a professional basketball player. Pargo and his wife, Malaysia, lived in Riverwoods, Illinois since 2009, but filed for divorce in 2014.

Notes

References

External links

 EuroLeague profile

1979 births
Living people
American expatriate basketball people in Canada
American expatriate basketball people in Greece
American expatriate basketball people in Russia
American men's basketball players
Arkansas Razorbacks men's basketball players
Atlanta Hawks players
Basketball coaches from Illinois
Basketball players from Chicago
BC Dynamo Moscow players
Big3 players
Charlotte Bobcats players
Charlotte Hornets players
Chicago Bulls players
Greek Basket League players
Long Beach Jam players
Los Angeles Lakers players
Neosho County Panthers men's basketball players
New Orleans Hornets players
Oklahoma City Blue players
Olympiacos B.C. players
People from Riverwoods, Illinois
Point guards
Portland Trail Blazers assistant coaches
Toronto Raptors players
Undrafted National Basketball Association players
Washington Wizards players
Windy City Bulls coaches
American men's 3x3 basketball players